WMTU-FM 91.9 is a campus radio station run by the students at Michigan Technological University. It is found in the basement of Wadsworth Hall. It works 24 hours a day, 7 days a week. Staff is constituted of a volunteer general staff featuring a general manager and six different departments as well as the air staff.  Open DJ signups are held the first Wednesday and Thursday of each semester, including the summer tracks.

History
The station's precursor, WVRW (Voice of Radio, Wadsworth), began broadcasting in 1956, as a carrier current AM station. It changed its callsign to WRS (Wadsworth Radio Service) two years later, to show that it now served all dormitories on campus. The current WMTU callsign was adopted in 1975. Two years after that WMTU began broadcasting as a cable FM station via the local cable television system. The 24-hour format, with three-hour shows, was adopted two years later in 1979.

In 1993 WMTU received an FM broadcasting license from the Federal Communications Commission (FCC). The following year the station began over-the-air broadcasting from atop the Mechanical Engineering and Engineering Mechanics building on the Michigan Tech campus with an effective radiated power of 100 watts. In 1998 WMTU began broadcasting via RealAudio, utilizing a Helix server located in the basement of Michigan Tech's Electrical Engineering Resources Center (EERC).

In 2004 renovations to Wadsworth Hall resulted in a move from the original location next to the Tri-Hall Weight Club to a temporary location near the Campus Cafe. In 2005 the FCC approved a request for WMTU to move its transmitter to a university-owned tower atop Arcadia Hill. This allowed the station to upgrade its power from 100 watts to 4400 watts effective radiated power, providing coverage to campus as well as many surrounding communities. Later that year the station returned to its original location, now sporting a new "storefront" look along with nearly triple the music storage space. Renovations also resulted in a "commons" area outside of the station, used for small concerts and other activities, as well as a room which the WMTU staff uses for weekly meetings.

In 2009 WMTU changed its daily schedule to 12 two-hour shows. In 2012 the station remodeled its DJ booth with new equipment and a new look, and began broadcasting continuous 24-hour broadcast over breaks for the first time.

Station programming
WMTU currently runs seventy programs, all of which are staffed by volunteers who apply at semesterly DJ meetings. Primetime slots are generally allocated based upon seniority, volunteer work at the station, and uniqueness of programming offered. All programming decisions are made by the Program Director and the Broadcast Supervisor, both positions elected yearly by WMTU's General Staff.

WMTU allows DJs to play music of their choice without any prescribed playlisting. Commercial free programming including metal, hip hop, techno, punk, indie, classic rock, electronica, Americana, noise, industrial, world, local, and freeform all appear on WMTU's current programming schedule.

The Local Music Show used to air every Saturday evening from 5-7pm. This program was formed by local musicians and DJs Brian Weeden and Markku Savolainen for WMTU in 2003, and highlighted both local and touring acts in the area, often including live in-studio performances and interviews. Local artists that have performed on air include Erik Koskinen, VSEPR, the Lumber Janes, Flashing Red Airplane, Carp, and Sycamore Smith. In the fall semester of the 2010 school year local music blog Mostly Midwest partnered with WMTU for an official Mostly Midwest radio show every Tuesday and Thursday from 6-8pm. This program showcases local midwestern acts and promotes upcoming local area shows, as well as providing information on upcoming local CD releases, interviews with out-of-town musicians, and occasional CD giveaways.

The DJ of the Week program airs each Saturday afternoon from 2pm-5pm, featuring WMTU's up-and-coming DJs and giving the programming and broadcasting departments the chance to evaluate the musical selections and general style of newer DJs.

Spotlight on... airs Saturday afternoon from noon-2pm. This program, usually hosted by a current WMTU DJ, presents two hours of studio favorites and rarities from one of the DJs favorite artists.

"PB and JAMZ" airs Thursdays from 12pm to 2pm EST, hosted by DJ Suckaa.

Concerts
Concert space has been provided to WMTU by the Campus Cafe (the Wads Annex), the McArdle Theatre (the Black Box), the Memorial Union Building commons, the Suburban Exchange, the ExUrban, the Level 2 Skate Park, and a commons area outside of WMTU's current location.

The Copper Country Crush-a-Thon, established 2002, is an annual metal festival sponsored by WMTU.  The day-long show allows the students of Michigan Tech and the surrounding communities the opportunity to see live black, death, and speed metal alongside of punk rock and hardcore.  The Crush-a-Thon has presented a number of bands from around the United States including Summon, Summer Dying, Dumah, The Chasm, Oddity, Eternal Silence, Usurper, Azrael, Autumnal Wind, Tower of Babel, Undo Tomorrow, Carnivale, Days Go By, Domain Malevolence, Off Kilter, the Miscreants, Enrapture, Forest of Impaled, AllOddsAgainst, Conceived by Fire, Sadomasochism, sah, Militionary, Dead to Fall, Teratism, And the Sky Went Red, Rellik, and the Nain Rogue.

Keweenawesomefest, established in 2007, is a two-day festival sponsored by WMTU presenting a number of musicians from throughout the state of Michigan.  Past performers have included Frontier Ruckus, Low, Chris Bathgate, Beep Beep, Deastro, Canada, Fred Thomas, SAH, Matt Jones, Misty Lyn, the Mahonies, Annie Palmer, Terrible Twos, Santa and Rudolph, Charlie Slick, the Betamales, Sycamore Smith, the Mighty Narwhale, Anarkinda, This is Deer Country, The Photographers, Cotton Jones, Drink Up Buttercup, The Daredevil Christopher Wright, Bear Claw, John the Savage, Millions of Brazilians and Electric Six.

Other local, regional, and national touring acts WMTU has presented live in concert include Black Eyed Snakes, The French Irish Coalition, Wesley Willis, Small Brown Bike, the Gunshy, Starlight Drifters, Poster Children, MC Juice, Heiruspecs, Great Lakes Myth Society, Chris Bathgate, Jerry Fels, Sycamore Smith, Third Coast, Deadly Waters, Pseudocell, Avert, The Blackflies, Dirty Americans, Paper Street Saints, Quixote, the Blend, the Crest, Modill, The Show Is the Rainbow, the Mae Shi, the Mercury Program, Squirtgun, Das Sücktet, Athletic Mic League, Honda Civic, Calumet-Hecla, the National Bummer, Breathe Smoke, Kristin Forbes, the Saurus, Atombombpocketknife, Kid Brother Collective, Chiodos, Kinetic Stereo Kids, Soma 220, Liquid Sun, Erik Koskinen, Switch, Tall Drink of Water, Milton, Minus, Hell Town Trio, Fried Chinese Donalds, Old Victoria, Nobody Likes a Tricycle, VSEPR, Mustard Plug, Djiaant, Tom Berringer and the Pisst-Off Androids.

References
Michiguide.com - WMTU-FM History
Variety of Music Showcased at WMTU-Sponsored Concert
WMTU lives again after long outage
WMTU tower on the move
Flint and local bands to play at skatepark
WMTU Constitution

External links

Official Website

MTU-FM
Michigan Technological University
Radio stations established in 1994
1994 establishments in Michigan